Wil is a district of the Canton of St. Gallen, Switzerland. It is named after the regional centre Wil, which is the largest city of the district. The district capital is Wil.

Demographics
Of the foreign population , 947 were from Germany, 2,336 were from Italy, 6,127 were from ex-Yugoslavia, 439 were from Austria, 820 were from Turkey, and 2,029 were from other countries. Also , 58,596 people spoke German, 196 people spoke French, 1,494 people spoke Italian, and 81 people spoke Romansh.

The age distribution  in the Wil district was: 8,617 (13.0%) were 0–9 years old; 9,137 (13.8%) were 10-19; 8,318 people (12.5%) were 20–29 years old; 10,883 people (16.4%) were 30-39; 9,599 people (14.5%) were 40-49; and 8,018 people (12.1%) were 50-59. The population distribution above 60 years of age was: 5,433 (8.2%) were 60-69; 3,908 people (5.9%) were 70-79; 2,102 people (3.2% ) were 80-89; 330 people (0.5%) were aged 90–99; and 5 people were aged 100 or over.

 there were 8,002 people (12.1% of the population) who were living alone in a private dwelling. There were 14,333 (21.6%) people who were part of a couple (married or otherwise committed) without children, and 37,617 (56.7%) who were part of a couple with children. There were 3,380 (5.1%) people who lived in single parent home, while there were 399 people who were adult children living with one or both parents. 269 people lived in a household made up of relatives, 444 lived in households made up of unrelated people, and 1,906 were either institutionalized or lived in another type of collective housing.

Out of the total population in Region Wil, the highest education level completed by 13,989 people (21.1% of the population) was Primary, while 24,675 people (37.2%) completed Secondary. 7,191 people (10.8%) attended a Tertiary school, and 2,931 people (4.4%) did not attend school. The remainder did not answer this question.

Economy
, the average unemployment rate was 4.1%.

Religion
Of the rest of the population, 1,946 people (2.93%) belong to the Orthodox Church, 1,617 people (2.44%) belong to another Christian church, and 15 people (0.02%) belong to the Christian Catholic faith. In addition, there are 4,195 people (6.32%) who are Islamic, 460 people (0.69%) who belong to another church (not listed on the census), and 17 people (0.03%) who are Jewish. 4,050 people (6.10%) do not belong to any church and are agnostic or atheist, and 2,067 individuals (about 3.12% of the population) did not answer the question.

Municipalities

Mergers and name changes
The municipality of Bronschhofen merged into Wil on 1 January 2013.

References

 
Constituencies of the canton of St. Gallen